Other Worlds may refer to:

 Other Worlds (Taken by Trees album), 2012
 Other Worlds (Screaming Trees album), 1985
 Other Worlds (magazine), an American science fiction magazine
 Other Worlds, 2022 album by The Pretty Reckless
 Other Worlds, 1998 short film by Makoto Shinkai

See also
 Otherworld (disambiguation)